Peter Weber (born 22 December 1938) is a German former gymnast. He competed in all artistic gymnastics events at the 1964 and 1968 Summer Olympics and won two bronze medals in the team classification. Individually his best achievement was 16th place in the rings in 1964. He also won a bronze medal with the East German team at the 1966 World Artistic Gymnastics Championships. Nationally, he won two titles in the rings, in 1964 and 1967, and one on the floor in 1965.

References

1938 births
Living people
German male artistic gymnasts
Olympic gymnasts of the United Team of Germany
Olympic gymnasts of East Germany
Gymnasts at the 1964 Summer Olympics
Gymnasts at the 1968 Summer Olympics
Olympic bronze medalists for the United Team of Germany
Olympic bronze medalists for East Germany
Olympic medalists in gymnastics
Medalists at the 1968 Summer Olympics
Medalists at the 1964 Summer Olympics
Medalists at the World Artistic Gymnastics Championships
People from Finsterwalde
Sportspeople from Brandenburg
20th-century German people
21st-century German people